San Pedro del Gallo is one of the 39 municipalities of Durango, in north-western Mexico. The municipal seat lies at San Pedro del Gallo. The municipality covers an area of 2,008.3 km².

As of 2010, the municipality had a total population of 1,709, up from 1,486 as of 2005. 

The municipality had 73 localities, none of which had a population over 1,000.

References

Municipalities of Durango